Christian William may refer to:

 Christian William of Brandenburg (1587–1665), titular Margrave of Brandenburg and Archbishop of Magdeburg
 Christian William I, Prince of Schwarzburg-Sondershausen (1647–1721)

See also
 Christian Williams (born 1943), American journalist